The national anthem of the Orange Free State (Afrikaans: Vrystaatse Volkslied, Dutch: Volkslied van de Oranje Vrijstaat) was used from 1854 until 1902 as the national anthem of the Orange Free State.



Lyrics

See also

 National anthem of South Africa
 "Die Stem van Suid-Afrika"
 National anthem of the Transvaal
 List of national anthems

References

Further reading

External links

Historical national anthems
Orange Free State
African anthems
Dutch-language songs